Cenkwon (Samaru Kataf) is a town in Jei District of Zangon Kataf Local Government Area in southern Kaduna state in the Middle Belt region of Nigeria. The postal code of the area is 802.

People

Language

Education
In terms of education, the town is home to a Technical College, Tafawa Balewa Memorial Commercial College (founded 1988) and the School of Agricultural Technology, Nuhu Bamalli Polytechnic, at Matakama (Tagama).

See also
 List of villages in Kaduna State

References

External links

Populated places in Kaduna State